Stephen Arne Douglas Greaves, Jr. (February 26, 1854 - December 5, 1915) was a planter and a Democratic member of the Mississippi House of Representatives, representing Hinds County, from 1908 to 1912.

Biography 
Stephen Arne Douglas Greaves, Junior, was born on February 26, 1854, in Livingston, Mississippi. He was the eldest son of brigadier general and state legislator Stephen A. D. Greaves Sr. and Sarah (Lowe) Greaves. His siblings included fellow Mississippi legislators John M. Greaves and Clarence Greaves, his full siblings, and another Mississippi legislator, Harry B. Graves, his half-brother. He attended the public schools of Madison County and attended the Summerville Institute near Shuqualak, Mississippi, from 1872 to 1873. He represented Hinds County in the Mississippi House of Representatives as a Democrat from 1908 to 1912. He died from liver trouble on December 5, 1915.

References 

1854 births
1915 deaths
Democratic Party members of the Mississippi House of Representatives